Mosby Glacier is a glacier  wide at its mouth, flowing in a southeasterly direction to the northwest corner of New Bedford Inlet, on the east coast of Palmer Land, Antarctica. It was discovered and photographed from the air in December 1940 by the United States Antarctic Service. During 1947 it was photographed from the air by the Ronne Antarctic Research Expedition under Finn Ronne, who in conjunction with the Falkland Islands Dependencies Survey (FIDS) mapped its terminus from the ground. It was named by the FIDS for Hakon Mosby, a Norwegian meteorologist and oceanographer.

References

Glaciers of Palmer Land